The Republic of Ireland national netball team is the national netball team of the Republic of Ireland. Their best performance at international tournament was a 10th-place finish in the 1991 World Netball Championships. As of the 25th August 2022, the Republic of Ireland are 24th in the INF World Rankings. The current team members are below.

Players

Competitive record

The Irish team claimed their first Netball Europe Festival win in Gibraltar. Ireland took on Malta, Israel, Switzerland and hosts Gibraltar on their way to the crown in what was their first time playing world ranking games.
Losing only once in the opening round, they dominated the competition and finished with an emphatic 53–17 win over Gibraltar.
Ireland competed in Singapore finishing 4th, the most successful the nation has been at the tournament. Since then Ireland has competed in  Hong Kong in February 2018 in the Asian Quad Series, where they walked away with gold and in Gibraltar where they were undefeated with another gold under their belt.

References

National netball teams of Europe
Netball in Ireland
Netball
Women's national sports teams of Ireland